Santa Bárbara Department may refer to:

 Santa Bárbara Department, Jujuy in Jujuy Province, Argentina
 Santa Bárbara Department, Honduras